Krzywie may refer to:

Krzywie, Lublin Voivodeship, Poland
Krzywie, Masovian Voivodeship, Poland